Bhagwan Mahavir Government Museum is an archaeological museum located in the Kadapa City of Andhra Pradesh. It was established in 1982 by the government to protect the ancient artifacts of archaeological importance. It' establishment was funded by a Jain businessman and hence was named after their deity Mahavira. The idols of Lord Ganesha, Lord Vishnu, Lord Hanuman and Lord Shiva are present inside the museum which date back to the period between the 5th and the 18th century. All these antiquities made of granite, dolomite, limestone, bronze icons were found in the excavations carried out at different places of Cuddapah, Hyderabad and Kurnool districts.

References

1982 establishments in Andhra Pradesh
Archaeological museums in India
Kadapa
Museums established in 1982
Museums in Andhra Pradesh
Buildings and structures in Kadapa district
Education in Kadapa district